Peribonio is a surname. Notable people with the surname include:

Tomas Peribonio (born 1996), Ecuadorian swimmer
Tonči Peribonio (born 1960), Croatian handball goalkeeper and coach